Keith William Hooker (born 31 January 1950) is an English retired professional footballer who played as a wing half in the Football League for Brentford.

Career

Brentford 
Hooker progressed through the Brentford youth team to make his senior debut at age 16 in a 0–0 Fourth Division draw with Wrexham on 14 January 1967, due to an injury crisis. He impressed enough to make 9 further appearances during the remainder of the 1966–67 season and scored his maiden goal for the club with the only goal of the game versus Notts County on 1 April. Hooker was a first team regular during the 1967–68 season and made 23 appearances, scored one goal and signed a professional contract in February 1968. He made just one appearance during the 1968–69 season and departed the club at the end of the campaign. Hooker made 34 appearances and scored two goals for the Bees.

Brentwood Town (loan) 
While with Brentford, Hooker had a loan spell with Essex Olympian League club Brentwood Town.

South Africa 
After his release from Brentford, Hooker moved to South Africa and played for National Football League clubs Durban Spurs and Port Elizabeth City between 1970 and 1972. He played under former teammate Matt Crowe at the latter club.

Personal life 
After his retirement from football, Hooker remained in South Africa.

Career statistics

References

1950 births
People from Fleet, Hampshire
English footballers
Brentford F.C. players
English Football League players
National Football League (South Africa) players
Expatriate soccer players in South Africa
English expatriate footballers
Addington F.C. players
Brentwood Town F.C. players
Living people
English expatriate sportspeople in South Africa
Association football wing halves